Abeh-ye Hajji Nazar (also Romanized as Ābeh-ye Ḩājjī Naẓar; also known as Ḩājīnaẓar) is a village in Daland Rural District, in the Central District of Ramian County, Golestan Province, Iran. At the 2006 census, its population was 99, in 23 families.

References 

Populated places in Ramian County